A clove is the aromatic dried flower bud of a tree in the family Myrtaceae.

Clove may also refer to:

 Garlic clove, a segment of a bulb (head) of garlic
 Clove (weight), an old English unit of weight
 Clove (ship), a ship captained by John Saris
 Clove Brook, a stream in New Jersey, US
 Clove, a fictional character in The Hunger Games

See also
 Clove hitch, a kind of knot
 Clove cigarette, Indonesian cigarettes made from tobacco, cloves and flavoring
 Clover
 Clovis